Wham-Bam-Slam! is a 1955 short subject directed by Jules White starring American slapstick comedy team The Three Stooges (Moe Howard, Larry Fine and Shemp Howard). It is the 164th entry in the series released by Columbia Pictures starring the comedians, who released 190 shorts for the studio between 1934 and 1959.

Plot
Shemp has been ill with a toothache for quite some time. The Stooges' friend Claude (Matt McHugh) gives Moe and Larry some specific instructions on how to cure the toothache, which, of course, they misinterpret every which way possible. After finally yanking the troublesome tooth, Claude suggests they take Shemp on a camping trip for a little R&R. Since the Stooges do not own a car, Claude offers to sell them a car that turns out to be a "lemon".

The trio run into a series of mishaps trying to get the car to work, including a flat tire that lands Moe's foot under the car. After all is said and done, Shemp realizes that he feels better after all.

Production notes
Wham-Bam-Slam! is a reworking of 1948's Pardon My Clutch, using ample recycled footage from the original. The new scenes (including Shemp's toe squashed by a lobster, leading to a cossack dance) were filmed on January 18, 1955. Both films borrow plot elements from the Laurel and Hardy shorts Perfect Day (1929) and Them Thar Hills (1934).

Quotes
Larry: "You know, fish is great brain food."
Moe: "You know, you should fish for a whale!" *SLAP!*

See also
List of American films of 1955

References

External links 
 
 
Wham-Bam-Slam! at threestooges.net

1955 films
1955 comedy films
The Three Stooges films
American black-and-white films
The Three Stooges film remakes
Films directed by Jules White
Columbia Pictures short films
1950s English-language films
1950s American films
American comedy short films